Longhi may refer to:

 Alessandro Longhi (1733–1813), painter
 Alessandro Longhi (footballer) (born 1989), Italian footballer who plays for Serie B team Padova
 Barbara Longhi (1552–1638), painter, daughter of Luca
 Damiano Longhi (born 1966), footballer
Giulia Longhi (born 1993), Italian softball player
 Jhonatan Longhi (born 1988), skier
 Luca Longhi (1507–1580), painter, father of Barbara
 Martino Longhi the Elder (1534–1591), architect
 Martino Longhi the Younger (1602–1660), architect
 Onorio Longhi (1568–1619), architect
 Pietro Longhi (1701–1785 or 1702–1785), painter
 Roberto Longhi (1890–1970), Italian academic and art historian
 Giuseppe Longhi (1766–1831), Italian printmaker and writer

See also
 Fondazione Roberto Longhi, Via Benedetto Fortini, Florence, is an institute established by Italian scholar Roberto Longhi, who in 1971 left his library, photo library and collection of art "for the benefit of future generations"
 Lunghi, an alternate spelling of the name Longhi
 Anigre, a type of wood with a common name of Longhi